Zálší is a municipality and village in Tábor District in the South Bohemian Region of the Czech Republic. It has about 200 inhabitants.

Administrative parts
The village of Klečaty is an administrative part of Zálší.

History
The first written mention of Zálší is from 1347.

References

Villages in Tábor District